Bill,  Billy, Willie or William Orr may refer to:

In activism or public service
William Orr (United Irishman) (1766–1797), member of United Irishmen who was executed
William Orr (Australian politician) (1843–1929), Australian politician and mining prospector
Sir William Orr-Ewing, 2nd Bt. (1848–1903), son of Sir Archibald Orr-Ewing, 1st Baronet
William Edwin Orr (1881–1965), American federal judge
William Orr (trade unionist) (1900–1954), Australian coal miner and trade unionist
Bill Orr (Nebraska first gentleman) (1935–2013), American insurance executive and Nebraska's only First Gentleman

In sports
Willie Orr (1873–1946), Scottish football player and manager
Willie Orr (footballer, born 1875) (1875–1912), footballer for Fulham F.C. 
Billy Orr (footballer) (1883–1963), Australian rules footballer
Billy Orr (baseball) (1891–1967), Major League Baseball infielder
Bill Orr, American racing driver in 1964 and 1965 Armstrong 500#Results
Billy Orr (ice hockey) (born 1948), Canadian  professional ice hockey defenceman
Will Orr, New Zealand rally driver in 1992 World Rally Championship#Drivers' championship
Bill Orr (football coach) (born 1983), Scottish Football Coach, Head of Performance Analysis for Stirling Albion Football Club

Other
William Somerville Orr (before 1820–1873), English publisher and founder of William S Orr & Co.
William McFadden Orr (1866–1934), British and Irish mathematician
William Orr, American architect who built 1928 First Presbyterian Church (San Luis Obispo, California)
William Orr, Scottish theatre director who immigrated to Australia and founded Phillip Street Theatre in 1953
William T. Orr (1917–2002), American television producer
William I. Orr (1919–2001), American amateur radio licensee and author

See also
William Orr House, on National Register of Historic Places listings in LaPorte County, Indiana
Billie Orr, American advocate for political and education reform since 1970